Brooklyn Bridge is an American sitcom television series which aired on CBS between September 20, 1991, to August 6, 1993. It is about a Jewish American family living in Brooklyn in the middle 1950s. The premise was partially based on the childhood of executive producer and creator Gary David Goldberg.

Brooklyn Bridge won a Golden Globe for Best Television Comedy or Musical and was nominated for the Primetime Emmy Award for Outstanding Comedy Series in 1992.

Throughout the TV show there are various references to the family's origins as Jews from Poland/Russia. There are also various references and actions showing how the young boys feel as Americans.

The cast was led by Marion Ross; Art Garfunkel performed the theme song, which was titled "Just Over the Brooklyn Bridge."

In 1997, "When Irish Eyes Are Smiling" was ranked number 46 on TV Guides 100 Greatest Episodes of All Time.

DVD release
Gary David Goldberg had announced on his official website that CBS Home Entertainment (with distribution by Paramount Home Entertainment) would release the complete series of Brooklyn Bridge on DVD in Region 1 in the middle of May 2010. However, the DVD was later delayed indefinitely.

Cast
Marion Ross as Sophie Berger (all)
Danny Gerard as Alan Silver (all)
Louis Zorich as Jules Berger (all)
Amy Aquino as Phyllis Berger Silver (32 episodes)
Peter Friedman as George Silver (32 episodes)
Matthew Louis Siegel as Nathaniel Silver (all)
Jenny Lewis as Katie Monahan (18 episodes)
Constance McCashin as Rosemary Monahan (6 episodes)

Episodes

Season 1 (1991–92)

Season 2 (1992–93)

Awards and nominations

References

External links

CBS original programming
1990s American sitcoms
1991 American television series debuts
1993 American television series endings
Television series about families
Television series about Jews and Judaism
Television shows set in Brooklyn
Television series set in the 1950s
Television series by CBS Studios
Best Musical or Comedy Series Golden Globe winners
Brooklyn in fiction
Television series by Ubu Productions
Television series created by Gary David Goldberg